James Moore, II was (1667February 17, 1723) was the first elected Governor of the Province of South Carolina and served from 1719 to 1721.

James Moore, II was born in Charles Town, Province of South Carolina in 1667.  His father was James Moore, I (16501706), who was the English governor of the Province of South Carolina from 1704 to 1706.  His mother was Margaret Berringer.

References

 
 

1667 births
1723 deaths
18th-century American politicians
Colonial governors of South Carolina
American people of English descent
Politicians from Charleston, South Carolina